Ḥabīb ibn Maslama al-Fihrī (–) was an Arab general during the Early Muslim conquests, under Mu'awiyah ibn Abi Sufyan.

Life

Origin and career under Umar
Born in Mecca , Habib was a member of the Muharib ibn Fihr clan of the Quraysh tribe (the tribe to which Muhammad belonged). He fought with distinction in the Muslim conquest of the Levant and of Upper Mesopotamia against the Byzantines. He led a cavalry squadron in the Battle of Yarmuk, and Caliph Umar appointed him first as governor of Homs and later of Upper Mesopotamia.

His record in the battles against the Byzantines led to his nickname of Ḥabīb al-Rūm ("Habib of the Byzantines", which if translated fully results in the rather ironic "The Beloved One of the Byzantines"). Caliph Umar is said to have been impressed by him, and to have opened the treasury (or the arsenal, according to other accounts) for him to take what he wished; Habib only took a set of weapons, leaving the treasure untouched.

Career under Uthman
Caliph Uthman instructed the governor of Syria, Mu'awiyah ibn Abi Sufyan, to send him in an expedition to Byzantine-controlled Armenia—although some sources insist that the Caliph commissioned Habib directly. Muslim sources place this event right after Uthman's accession in 644, but Byzantine and Armenian sources place it ten years later, in 653/654. The campaign was a great success for the Arabs: Habib's forces took Melitene and defeated the Byzantine governor of Armenia, Maurianos, in a night attack near Dvin. According to the Armenian historian Sebeos, the Arabs pursued the defeated Byzantine commander as far as Caucasian Iberia or even the Black Sea, and took Trapezus and Theodosiopolis.

The treaties of capitulation for Dvin and Tiflis that he concluded at that time are preserved by the literary sources. During this expedition, he is said to have brought one of his wives, Umm Abdallah bint Yazid al-Kalbiyya, with him, who was as valiant and fearless as he. Before the night assault on Maurianos' camp, he is reported to have asked her where he would find her after the battle, and she replied "either in Maurianos' tent, or in paradise". When Habib reached the Byzantine commander's tent, she was already there.

First Fitna and career under Mu'awiyah
Habib was briefly appointed governor of the subdued Armenian territories, but was then recalled to take command of the borderlands with Byzantium in northern Syria, centred on Qinnasrin, from where he was engaged in fighting against the Mardaites and the Byzantines.

When Uthman was besieged at his home in Medina by rebels, Mu'awiyah sent Habib with 4,000 Syrian troops to rescue him, but his vanguard had only reached Wadi al-Qura in the northern Hejaz when news of Uthman's murder reached him. Historian Wilferd Madelung however considers stories of Uthman's requesting aid against fellow Muslims a later invention. In the civil war that broke out following, he remained loyal to Mu'awiyah. During the armistice and negotiations that followed the first clashes between the supporters of Mu'awiyah and those of Muhammad's cousin and son-in-law Ali ibn Abi Talib, Habib, along with Shurahbil ibn al-Simt al-Kindi and Ma'n ibn Yazid ibn al-Akhnas al-Sulami, was sent as an envoy to Ali. Habib demanded of Ali the surrender of Uthman's murderers, as well as asking him to resign the caliphal office and submitting the issue of succession to a council (shura), terms which Ali rejected with scorn.

During the three-day Battle of Siffin on July 26–28, Habib commanded the left wing of the Syrian forces, facing Abdallah ibn Budayl at the head of Yemenite forces stiffened by a force of "Quran readers". He played a major role during the first day, when Ibn Budayl advanced towards Mu'awiyah's position in the centre, with the aim of personally killing the Syrian leader. Habib counterattacked and routed the entire right wing of Ali's army, surrounded Ibn Budayl and the Quran readers, and began pushing towards Ali's centre in turn. One of Ali's generals, al-Ashtar, managed to rally the retreating right wing and rescue Ibn Budayl, but a new assault by the latter on Mu'awiyah's position failed and he was killed. According to Ibn Khallikan, Habib's "signal service at the Battle of Siffin" made him one of Mu'awiyah's favourite generals. After Mu'awiyah became caliph, he appointed Habib governor of Armenia and Adharbayjan.

Death and legacy
One account, however, records him as being alive in 671.

His reputation among later generations was impressive: tall and a successful commander, he was admired for his moral rectitude and reputed to perform miracles through prayer. According to one story, after his death the Caliph Mu'awiyah prostrated himself in thanks to God for having such a servant; Habib had demanded that he [Mu'awiyah] follow the norms of the rightly-guided caliphs Umar and Abu Bakr, and Mu'awiyah had complied.

This reputation led to subsequent claims that he was to be placed among the Sahabah, the companions to Muhammad. These claims were promoted by his numerous descendants, but also by the Umayyad partisans, who in their quarrels over legitimacy with the Alids tried to claim the allegiance of as many Sahabah as possible for Mu'awiyah. While Habib himself claims to have met Muhammad in Medina and campaigned with him, most sources insist that he was twelve years old when Muhammad died, thus having played no role in the latter's regime. Isolated sources give very different accounts, claiming that he was merely two years old or as old as 22 when Muhammad died; some sources accept him as a source of hadiths, while others dismiss him.

Family
Habib had three wives, all from the tribe of Banu Kalb, among them Na'ila bint Umara al-Kalbiyya, who had formerly been married to Mu'awiya. Two of his sons survived him. One of them, Maslama, commanded the contingent from Damascus during the Second Arab Siege of Constantinople in 717–718. Habib owned a house in Damascus, overlooking the Barada River, as well as a residence in the city's environs, in the Hawran. The 9th-century scholar Abu Zur'a al-Dimashqi reported that Habib's descendants were numerous in the Hawran area.

See also

References

Sources
 
 
 
 
 
 

610s births
662 deaths
7th-century Arabs
7th century in Armenia
Arab people of the Arab–Byzantine wars
People of the First Fitna
Generals of the Rashidun Caliphate
People from Mecca
Quraysh
Generals of the Umayyad Caliphate
Year of birth unknown
Umayyad governors of Arminiya
People of the Muslim conquest of the Levant
Rashidun governors of Arminiya